Etobicoke North is a federal electoral district in Toronto, Ontario, Canada, that has been represented by one Member of Parliament in the House of Commons of Canada since 1979. It covers the neighbourhood of Rexdale, in the northern part of the Etobicoke district of Toronto.

The riding was created in 1976 from parts of Etobicoke and York West. In the House of Commons, the riding has been represented by Liberal Kirsty Duncan since 2008.

Geography

The riding consists of the northwestern part of the City of Toronto. The eastern boundary is the Humber River East Branch and the Humber River from Steeles Avenue West south to a point just to the east of the Dixon Road. The southern boundary runs west from the Humber River along Dixon Road to Martin Grove Road to Eglinton Avenue to the western limit of the city. The western and northern limits of the ridings are formed by the city limits.

In addition to Rexdale, the riding also contains the neighbourhoods of The Elms, Humberwood, Kingsview Village, Thistletown, and Willowridge.

This riding gained territory from Etobicoke Centre during the 2012 electoral redistribution.

Demographics

According to the 2011 Census, Etobicoke North has a population of 56,625, an increase of 3.6% between 2006 and 2011. 47% of families are couples with children, while 28% of families are couple without children, and 25% are Lone-parent families. The most common structures of occupied private dwellings are single-detached houses at 39.5%, and Apartment buildings that have 5 or more storeys at 36.1%.

The 2011 National Household Survey addressed households, immigration/migration, ethnocultural, education, labour force, and income/shelter factors. In terms of immigration, 54% of Etobicoke North residents are 1st generation, 30.9% are 2nd generation, and 14.6% are third generation Canadian or over. There were large waves of immigration to the area between 1991 and 2011, consisting of a total of 16560 people. The largest number of immigrants to the area were born in India at 8.7%, followed by Italy, Jamaica, Pakistan, Philippines, Guyana, Poland, United Kingdom, Sri Lanka, and Vietnam. The majority of recent immigrants residing in Etobicoke North were born in India, and 57.7% of the population are visible minorities.

The top Mother tongue is English, followed by Italian, then Punjabi. 4.0% of the population has no knowledge of English or French.

While 75% of residents of Etobicoke North have obtained a certificate, diploma, or degree, 25% of the population hold no certificate, diploma, or degree.

The average household income in 2010 was $72,100, and the average individual income was $32,995, with an unemployment rate of 10.0%.

According to the 2021 Canada Census

Ethnic groups: 28.2% South Asian, 24.0% Black, 21.0% White, 5.4% Latin American, 4.9% Filipino, 3.0% West Asian, 2.8% Arab, 1.8% Southeast Asian, 1.2% Chinese

Languages: 44.4% English, 7.0% Punjabi, 4.3% Gujarati, 4.0% Spanish, 2.7% Somali, 2.7% Italian, 2.4% Tagalog, 2.3% Urdu, 2.1% Assyrian, 1.7% Tamil, 1.6% Arabic, 1.5% Hindi, 1.0% Vietnamese, 1.0% Portuguese

Religions: 50.3% Christian (24.4% Catholic, 2.8% Pentecostal, 1.9% Christian Orthodox, 1.4% Anglican, 1.1% Baptist, 18.7% Other), 14.9% Muslim, 14.3% Hindu, 7.0% Sikh, 1.6% Buddhist, 11.3% None

Median income: $32,400 (2020)

Average income: $39,760 (2020)

Former boundaries

Members of Parliament

This riding has elected the following Members of Parliament:

Election results

See also
 List of Canadian federal electoral districts
 Past Canadian electoral districts

References

Federal riding history from the Library of Parliament
2011 Results from Elections Canada
 Campaign expense data from Elections Canada

Notes

Etobicoke
Federal electoral districts of Toronto
Ontario federal electoral districts
1976 establishments in Ontario